Dean Oliver may refer to:
 Dean Oliver (basketball) (born 1978), basketball player who played with the Golden State Warriors
 Dean Oliver (footballer) (born 1987), footballer who played for Sheffield United
 Dean Oliver (statistician) (born 1969), contributor to the statistical analysis of basketball